Edward Stewart (January 20, 1915 – August 30, 1999) was an American set decorator. He won an Academy Award and was nominated for another in the category Best Art Direction.

Selected filmography
Stewart won an Academy Award for Best Art Direction and was nominated for another:
Won
 All That Jazz (1979)
Nominated
 The Wiz (1978)

References

External links

American set decorators
Best Art Direction Academy Award winners
1999 deaths
1915 births